Queen Mamani kaPhahlo was a Queen of the AmaMpondomise Kingdom in her own right from the year 1732, following after her father King Phahlo. She is also known as Queen Mbingwa. As the eldest among 3 daughters of the Great Wife of King Phahlo, she successfully challenged her half-brothers from the smaller houses for the throne upon the death of her father. Although, she married Princess Ntsibatha, a Mpondo Princess, she passed way on the 1758 without Any hairs to the Thorne . She was succeeded by one of her brothers, King Sonthlo, who she installed in her position despite challenges from Within the royal family members at that time

Early life and family
Queen Mamani (sometimes called Mbingwa) was born to a Famale King of the AmaMpondomise Kingdom, King Phahlo, and a Xesibe Princess whose name is sadly not known. Queen Mamani's mother was the Great Wife. To her mother, she was the eldest of 3 daughters and did not have any brothers.  Her father had sons with his other wives. She was born in Around 1705 And passed away in Around 1758.

One of Queen Mamani's sisters, Princess  Thandela, married into the AmaXhosa Nation King Phalo and was the mother of King Gcaleka. Prince Gcaleka later became the King of the Xhosas. Not much is known about the other sister.

Ascending to the throne and reign
In the year 1732 Queen Mamani's father, King Phahlo, passed on. Traditionally her father was meant to be succeeded by a child of the Great Wife. However, custom dictated that the heir needed to be a male heir. If the Great Wife did not have male children, like Queen Mamani's mother, then a male heir would be searched for among the children of the other wives, starting with the wife married to the king for the longest (i.e. most senior wife) followed by the junior wives (according their seniority), until a son is found. If a son is not found then one of the king's brothers would be King (preference given to the oldest brother and his male-descendants, then moving down to the youngest brother) would assume the position of King. 

However the Great Wife of King Phahlo did not have any male children. Defy tradition and custom, as the eldest of the 3 daughters of King Phahlo's Great Wife, Queen Mamani ascended the throne upon the death of her father. This event triggered the saying among historians who write about the AmaMpondomise Nation that "a woman who became a Famale king". 

When dissenters rose against her, she killed them. She mounted armies against those who challenged her authority too. Her reign was felt throughout the lands of the AmaMpondomise Nation (from uMthatha to Umzimkhulu. She was a strong monarch.

Marriage and issue 
Despite being a woman herself, Queen Mamani married a Princess from the AmaMpondo kingdom, the daughter of King Nyawuza called 
Princess Ntsibatha. Instead of consummating the marriage herself, she asked her dearest brother, Who was  Prince Sonthlo at the time before beaming known as King during his sister's reign, to do it for her. Prince Sonthlo was the son of Queen Mamani's maternal Aunt and Queen Mamani's father, King Phahlo's Wife.

Successor
Gradually she began to hand over monarchal duties to King Sonthlo, while, she actively influenced the successful transition of power to him. Thus, Sontlo became her successor while she was alive and continued to reign upon her death.

References

Legendary monarchs
Legendary progenitors
African queens